Francis Rapp (27 June 1926 – 29 March 2020) was a French medievalist specializing in the history of Alsace and medieval Germany. An emeritus university professor, he was a member of the Académie des inscriptions et belles-lettres since 1993.

Life

Youth 
Born in Strasbourg, the son of lawyer Léon Rapp, Rapp was born into a Catholic and patriotic family. He did his secondary studies at the Jean Sturm Gymnasium and practiced scouting within the Scouts de France. Breaking with forced incorporation, he joined a clandestine scouting group that gathered about twenty young people at the Mont Sainte-Odile from December 1942. At the end of the 1960s he joined the Association des Guides et Scouts d'Europe and was commissioner of the Alsace Province until the mid-1980s.

Academic career 
Rapp graduated as a major of the agrégation d'histoire in 1952, then was a teacher at the Lycée Fustel-de-Coulanges de Strasbourg between 1952 and 1953 and a resident of the Fondation Dosne-Thiers from 1956 to 1961; he was a lecturer at the faculté des lettres de Nancy from 1961 to 1972, then an assistant in medieval history at the Marc Bloch University of Strasbourg. After becoming a Doctor of Letters in 1972, he was a lecturer and then a professor at the University of Strasbourg from 1974.

Rapp was a member of the Consultative Committee of Universities, the Higher Council of University Bodies, the national committee of the Centre national de la recherche scientifique, the scientific council and the board of directors of the École nationale des chartes and the École française de Rome.

Rapp died on 29 March 2020 in Angers at the age of 93, following an infection from COVID-19.

Honours 
 Chevalier of the Légion d'honneur
 Commandeur de l'Ordre national du Mérite (He was promoted to the rank of Officer on 24 June 2005, and then received the rank of Commandeur by decree dated 13 May 2016.)
 Commandeur de l'ordre des Palmes académiques

Awards 
 Prix Guizot (2001).
  of the Académie française (1983).

Publications 
Rapp's publications are listed in the  database, including;
 Inventaire des sources manuscrites de l’histoire d’Alsace conservées dans les bibliothèques publiques de France, Paris, Fédération des sociétés d’histoire et d’archéologie d'Alsace, 1956.
 Le château-fort dans la vie médiévale : le château-fort et la politique territoriale, Strasbourg, Centre d'Archéologie médiévale, 1968.
 L’Église et la vie religieuse en Occident à la fin du Moyen Âge, Paris, PUF, coll. "Nouvelle Clio", 1971, .
 Réformes et réformation à Strasbourg. Église et société dans le diocèse de Strasbourg (1450–1525), Paris, Ophrys, 1974.
 Grandes figures de l’humanisme alsacien. Courants, milieux, destins, Strasbourg, Istra, 1978.
 Histoire de Strasbourg des origines à nos jours [under his dir.], 9 vols, Strasbourg, Dernières nouvelles de Strasbourg, 1981.
 Les origines médiévales de l’Allemagne moderne. De Charles IV à Charles Quint (1346–1519), Paris, 1989, .
 Histoire des diocèses de France : Le Diocèse de Strasbourg, Paris, 1997.
 Koenigsbruck : l’histoire d’une abbaye cistercienne (with ), Strasbourg, Société d’histoire et d’archéologie du Ried Nord, 1998.
 Le Saint-Empire romain germanique, d’Otton le Grand à Charles Quint, Paris, Éditions du Seuil, 2003. 
 Christentum und Kirche im 4. und 5. Jahrhundert, Heidelberg, Universitätsverlag Winter,  2003, 
 Christentum IV : Zwischen Mittelalter und Neuzeit (1378–1552), Stuttgart, Kohlhammer, 2006, 
 Maximilien d'Autriche, Paris, 2007. 
 Protestants et protestantisme en Alsace de 1517 à nos jours [under his dir.], Strasbourg, Fédération des sociétés d’histoire et d’archéologie d'Alsace, 2007.
 Strasbourg [under his dir.], Paris, La Nuée Bleue, 2010.

References

External links 

 Rapp, Francis on Persée
 "Francis Rapp, vivre dans Strasbourg annexée", France 3.

Musicians from Strasbourg
1926 births
2020 deaths
20th-century French historians
21st-century French historians
French medievalists
Academic staff of the University of Neuchâtel
Members of the Académie des Inscriptions et Belles-Lettres
Chevaliers of the Légion d'honneur
Commanders of the Ordre national du Mérite
Commandeurs of the Ordre des Palmes Académiques
Alsatian people
Deaths from the COVID-19 pandemic in France
20th-century French male writers
21st-century French male writers
French male non-fiction writers
Academic staff of the University of Strasbourg
Historians of Germany
Scouting and Guiding in France